Ramling (Old Shirur) is a village in Pune district, Maharashtra, India, on a distance of 3km from Shirur on the way towards Pabal.

The village is known for a famous Shiva (Ramling) Temple.

Villages in Pune district